The 2022–23 Florida Gators women's basketball represents University of Florida in the 2022–23 college basketball season. Led by second year head coach Kelly Rae Finley, the team will play their games at O'Connell Center and are members of the Southeastern Conference.

Schedule and results

|-
!colspan=12 style=|Exhibition

|-
!colspan=12 style=|Non-conference regular season

|-
!colspan=12 style=|SEC regular season

|-
!colspan=9 style=| SEC Tournament

|-
!colspan=9 style=| WNIT Tournament

Rankings

See also
 2022–23 Florida Gators men's basketball team

References

Florida Gators women's basketball seasons
Florida
Florida Gators women's basketball
Florida Gators women's basketball